Marcelo Fabián Perugini (born 17 January 1984) is a retired Argentine football forward.

Career
Born in Buenos Aires, Perugini began playing youth football for Racing Club de Avellaneda. He started playing senior football for Club Villa Mitre before joining Primera B side Club Olimpo. After helping Olimpo gain promotion to the Primera Division, he left for San Martín de Tucumán in July 2008.

References

External links
Profile at epae.org

Guardian's Stats Centre
 

1984 births
Living people
Argentine footballers
Argentine expatriate footballers
Olimpo footballers
San Martín de Tucumán footballers
Gimnasia y Esgrima de Jujuy footballers
Racing Club de Avellaneda footballers
Villa Mitre footballers
Defensores de Belgrano footballers
Pierikos F.C. players
Sarmiento de Resistencia footballers
Club Aurora players
Club Comunicaciones footballers
Club Atlético Sansinena Social y Deportivo players
Deportivo Roca players
Association football forwards
Argentine expatriate sportspeople in Bolivia
Argentine expatriate sportspeople in Greece
Expatriate footballers in Bolivia
Expatriate footballers in Greece
Footballers from Buenos Aires